Einstein's Sink is an antique sink that has been in use by the physics faculty of Leiden University since 1920. Originally the sink stood in the large lecture room of the old Kamerlingh Onnes Laboratory. It was taken to the new building when the physicists moved to the Leiden Bioscience park in 1977. Here it still stands in the current large lecture room (The De Sitterzaal of the J.H. Oortgebouw), continuing the tradition of washing the hands of visiting famous scientists. A short list of 'sink users' consists out of Paul Ehrenfest, Heike Kamerlingh Onnes, Hendrik Antoon Lorentz and Albert Einstein. But also more recently nobel prize winners like Brian Schmidt and Albert Fert.

In 2015 plans were announced for a new science campus which will replace the current one in 2025. After some inquiries it was clear that the faculty board had no plans of moving the sink once more to the upcoming physics department and therefore a petition was started to 'save the sink'. Because of this the sink appeared in local and national media several times. The petition got 197 autographs within one month and was later presented to the faculty board. The science faculty accepted the petition and moved the sink to the De Sitter lecture room in the new Oort building, where it can keep serving the physicists like it did years before.

See also
Einstein's Blackboard

References

Sink
Leiden University